Area codes 918 and 539  are telephone area codes serving Tulsa and northeast Oklahoma. Besides Tulsa, these area codes cover cities such as Bartlesville, Broken Arrow, Claremore, Gore, Jenks, McAlester, Muskogee, Okmulgee, Pryor, Sapulpa, Tahlequah, and northeastern Oklahoma. 

Area code 918 was created in 1953 as a split from area code 405.  Area code 539 was created as an overlay for 918.  It became active on April 1, 2011 (although 539 numbers could have been assigned for activation before that date). Mandatory ten-digit dialing became effective on March 5, 2011. It is the first overlay in Oklahoma.

The other area codes for Oklahoma are 405 and 572, which cover the Oklahoma City Metropolitan Area in central Oklahoma, and 580, which covers northern, western, and southern Oklahoma areas outside of the OKC metro.

Towns and cities served by these area codes
Below is a full list of all towns and cities covered by the 539 and 918 area codes.

 Adair
 Afton
 Agra
 Albion
 Alderson
 Arkoma
 Avant
 Barnsdall
 Bartlesville
 Bearden
 Beggs
 Big Cabin
 Bixby
 Boatman
 Bokoshe
 Boley
 Boynton
 Braggs
 Bristow
 Broken Arrow
 Bugtussle
 Burbank
 Bushyhead
 Cameron
 Canadian
 Cardin
 Carlton Landing
 Carter Nine
 Castle
 Catoosa
 Checotah
 Chelsea
 Chouteau
 Claremore
 Clayton
 Cleveland
 Colcord
 Collinsville
 Commerce
 Copan
 Council Hill
 Coweta
 Crowder
 Cushing
 Davenport
 Delaware
 Depew
 Dewar
 Dewey
 Disney
 Drumright
 Dustin
 Eufaula
 Fairfax
 Fairland
 Fanshawe
 Foraker
 Fort Gibson
 Foyil
 Gans
 Glenpool
 Gore
 Grayson
 Grove
 Haileyville
 Hallett
 Hanna
 Hartshorne
 Haskell
 Heavener
 Henryetta
 Hitchita
 Hoffman
 Hominy
 Howe
 Hulbert
 Indianola
 Inola
 Jay
 Jenks
 Jennings
 Kansas
 Kellyville
 Kendrick
 Kenwood
 Keota
 Kiefer
 Kinta
 Kiowa
 Krebs
 Langley
 Le Flore
 Lenapah
 Lequire
 Locust Grove
 Mannford
 Marmec
 Marble City
 Mazie
 McAlester
 McCurtain
 Miami
 Moffett
 Morris
 Mounds
 Muldrow
 Muse
Muskogee
 New Tulsa
 North Miami
 Nowata
 Oakhurst
 Oaks
 Ochelata
 Oilton
 Okay
 Okemah
 Okmulgee
 Oktaha
 Oologah
 Osage
 Owasso
 Page
 Panama
 Park Hill
 Parkland
 Pawhuska
 Pawnee
 Peoria
 Pettit
 Picher
 Pittsburg
 Pocola
 Porter
 Porum
 Poteau
 Prue
 Pryor
 Quapaw
 Quinton
 Ralston
 Romana
 Red Oak
 Redbird
 Rentiesville
 Ripley
 Roland
 Salina
 Sallisaw
 Sand Springs
 Sapulpa
 Savanna
 Schulter
 Shady Point
 Shamrock
 Shidler
 Skiatook
 Slick
 South Coffeyville
 Sparks
 Spavinaw
 Sperry
 Spiro
 Stidham
 Stigler
 Stilwell
 Strang
 Stroud
 Stuart
 Taft
 Tahlequah
 Talala
 Tamaha
 Terlton
 Texanna
 Ti
 Tryon
 Tullahassee
 Tulsa
 Turley
 Tussy
 Twin Oaks
 Vera
 Verdigris
 Vian
 Vinita
 Wagoner
 Wainwright
 Wann
 Warner
 Watts
 Webbers Falls
 Welch
 Welling
 Westport
 Westville
 Whitefield
 Wilburton
 Wister
 Wyandotte
 Wynona
 Yale

References

External links

 List of exchanges from AreaCodeDownload.com, 918 Area Code

918
918
Telecommunications-related introductions in 1953
Telecommunications-related introductions in 2011